Jay Bernard (born 1988), FRSL, is a British writer, artist, film programmer, and activist from London, UK. Bernard has been a programmer at BFI Flare since 2014, co-editor of Oxford Poetry, and their fiction, non-fiction, and art has been published in many national and international magazines and newspapers. Bernard's work engages with LGBT identities and dialogues. Bernard believes that celebrations such as LGBT History Month are positive and beneficial, but there needs to be vigilance against those that use it for their own agendas.

Accolades 

Bernard was named a Foyle Young Poet of the year in 2005.

Bernard's pamphlet The Red and Yellow Nothing was shortlisted for the Ted Hughes Award in 2016. The collection tells of the story of Sir Morien, a black knight at Camelot. The reviewer for The London Magazine wrote: "Jay Bernard has created a rare and beautiful thing. Part contemporary verse drama, part mythic retelling....Employing metrical ballads and concrete poems with equal vigour, Bernard takes us on a visual and allusive journey to test the imagination, thus putting the poet’s resources of sight and sound to full use. ...reading The Red and Yellow Nothing brings continuous surprise."

Bernard won the 2017 Ted Hughes Award for new poetry for their multimedia performance work Surge: Side A, that includes the film Something Said, inspired by the 1981 New Cross house fire and archives held at the George Padmore Institute, where they were the first poet-in-residence. The 2014 novel A Brief History of Seven Killings by Marlon James, and Twilight City, a film produced by Reece Auguiste for the Black Audio Film Collective in 1989, also provided inspiration for the work.

Bernard was elected as a Fellow of the Royal Society of Literature in 2018.

Bernard's poetry collection, Surge, published by Chatto & Windus, was shortlisted for the T. S. Eliot prize in 2019, for the 2019 Costa Poetry Award, for the 2020 Dylan Thomas Prize, and the 2020 RSL Ondaatje Prize. It won the 2020 Sunday Times Young Writer of the Year Award.

Work

Pamphlets and single-author collections

 Your Sign is Cuckoo, Girl (Tall Lighthouse, 2008)
 English Breakfast (Math Paper Press, 2013)
 The Red and Yellow Nothing (Ink, Sweat and Tears Press, 2016), pamphlet, shortlisted for the Ted Hughes Award in 2016.
 Other Ubiquities (2017)
 Surge (Chatto, 2019).

Performances
Surge: Side A (2017), a multimedia performance piece that won the Ted Hughes Award for new poetry. The work was performed at the Roundhouse, London, during The Last Word Festival 2017, and was produced by Speaking Volumes.

A Toast to the People (2021) Jay Bernard also performed at the Edinburgh International Festival, a spoken word event with Debris Stephenson.

Films
 Something Said, screened at Encounters Festival (2017), CinemAfrica (2018), BFI Flare (2018).

Inclusion in anthologies and collections
Graphic art and poetry by Bernard appears in the following collections:

 City State (2009)
 "Black Britain: Beyond Definition", Wasafiri, Issue 64, Winter 2010.
 The Salt Book of Younger Poets (Salt 2011)
 Ten: The New Wave (Bloodaxe 2014)

Residencies
 2010: artist in residence at StAnza Poetry Festival.
 2012: fellow at the National University of Singapore, and curated a graphic arts and poetry exhibition I SEE YOU at The Arts House.
 2013: CityRead resident at the London Metropolitan Archives.
 2015: commissioned with artist Yemisi Blake as part of Transport for London’s Year of the Bus celebrations. Their work 100, which featured one hundred one-line poems, was displayed at North Greenwich Bus Station between January and September 2015.

Further work and collaborations 
 2022: After Work, made in collaboration with Céline Condorelli and Ben Rivers focuses on the building of a children’s playground, which Condorelli was commissioned to create in South London.

Personal life 
Bernard was born and grew up in Croydon, London, and read English at Oxford University. Bernard identifies as "black, queer", and uses the pronouns "they/ them". Their Jamaican-born grandmother, Gee Bernard (1934–2016), was the first black councillor in Croydon and the first black member of the Inner London Education Authority (ILEA).

References

External links
 Jay Bernard official website
 @Brrnrrd. Jay Bernard at Twitter.
 Nisha Jones, "In conversation with Jay Bernard", Wasafiri.
 "Jay Bernard – Breaking Ground interview" , Speaking Volumes, 29 April 2016. 
 Astrid Godfrey, "Jay Bernard: the Ted Hughes Prize Winner asking old questions and giving new answers", The Cambridge Student, 12 May 2018.
 Jay Bernard in conversation with Lola Olufemi, Housmans Bookshop, 26 May 2020.

Living people
1988 births
21st-century British poets
Black British writers
British LGBT poets
English people of Jamaican descent
Fellows of the Royal Society of Literature
LGBT Black British people
Non-binary poets
Writers from London